Jews have been living in Metro Detroit since it was first founded, and have been prominent in all parts of life in the city. The city has a rich Jewish history, but the Jewish community has also seen tensions and faced anti-Jewish backlash. Today, the Jewish community is quite established and has a number of community organizations and institutions.

Background information 

As of 2012, about 116,000 Jewish Americans live in Metro Detroit. In 2001, about 96,000 Jewish Americans lived in Metro Detroit. That year, 75% of them lived in Oakland County. Many are in walking distances to their synagogues.

The Jewish community includes Ashkenazi, Hasidic, and Sephardic origin Jews who follow those traditions. The religious movements represented include common versions of Conservative, Orthodox, Reform Judaism.

The nearby cities of Ann Arbor, Flint, Lansing,  and Ypsilanti have their own Jewish communities. Barry Stiefel, author of The Jewish Community of Metro Detroit 1945–2005, classifies these cities as being part of the "Greater Metro Detroit" region.

History

The First Jew In Detroit (1762–1783) 
The first recorded Jew in Detroit was Chapman Abraham, a fur trader from Montreal. In 1762, in order to trade he traveled south along the Detroit River. He was recorded that year. Until his 1783 death he had a residence in Detroit.

Detroit's First Jewish Neighborhood (1880–1930) 
German and Central European Jews found their homes in the Hasting Street Area neighborhood around 1880. Here, the professions of the middle class included proprietors, managers, and white collar workers. However, many of the elite were involved in politics. Some served in elected positions at the city and state level in the late 19th and early 20th centuries. But, after 1930, no Jew served on Detroit's elected Common Council until 1962.

Prohibition Era (1920–1930) 
In the 1920s and early 1930s, during the Prohibition Era, the Jewish Purple Gang operated alcohol smuggling and committed acts of violence in Detroit. By the early 1930s the gang had been weakened and organized crime groups from the East Coast wrested control of the territory from the Purple Gang.

Eastern European Arrivals (1900–1940)

Demographics 
Eastern European Jews arrived in Metropolitan Detroit in the 20th century. The German Jews left the Hastings Street neighborhood for the areas to the North and West of it. Such areas included east of Woodward Avenue near Warren and Oakland Avenues. In the 1930s several Jews leaving Germany under Adolf Hitler arrived in Detroit. In the 1940s the 12th Street/Linwood/Dexter area housed the Jewish community in Detroit. The community at one point moved to the Livernois-Seven Mile area. It later relocated to the Oakland County municipalities of Oak Park, Southfield, and West Bloomfield. The post-World War II Jewish community began to suburbanize. Barry Stiefel, author of The Jewish Community of Metro Detroit 1945–2005, wrote that "The move from Detroit to the suburbs north of Eight Mile Road was not a Jewish event, but one of socioeconomic class and race."

According to historian Lila Corwin Berman, Although not as populated as the Lower East Side, Jewish Hastings Street still struck reports as overcrowded and teeming with foreignness and a "queer" Yiddish dialect." The Michigan census in 1935 stated," 10% of Jews lived in the Hastings Street area and 80% of the Jewish population lived in two Neighborhoods. The Twelfth Street area and the neighborhood referred to as Dexter."

The local elementary school was the most populous in the city and had a predominantly Jewish student body. Synagogues and kosher markets lined the streets in this area of the city. The Dexter/Davison Market was where Jews came to show and to pause in their errands for conversations and to catch up with one another.

Economy 
According to Meyer, Jewish workers' incomes varied by industry. An income of $2,000 or more was received in 1934 by 33 percent of the Jewish workers who engaged in professional service, while only 5 percent of the workers in domestic and personal service industries and 6 percent of the Jewish workers in automobile factories reached that threshold. By 1935, The workforce was considered to be 34,459 people. The white collar occupation groups around that time included professional workers, proprietors, managers and officials, and clerks and kindred workers.

By 1937, 71,000 Jews lived in Detroit, which made it the sixth most populated Jewish city in the United States.

Tension (1936–1970)

Jewish Community Council 
The Jewish Community Council was a centralized Jewish organization founded in 1936. The aim of the organization was to coordinate Jewish activity with relations with non-Jews throughout the city. In the late 1930s, they turned its attention to the tension brewing in the Hastings Street area in the late 1930s.

Jewish and African American Conflict 
According to Berman, "In the fall of 1937, the rabbi of Temple Beth El, the city's largest Reform temple, chastised Jewish merchants in the Hastings street area for behaving unethically towards black customers. She also stated," Black/Jewish conflict flared between 1938 and 1941, especially along Hastings Street where youths assaulted merchants and their stores." However, there were some African Americans who considered Jews their allies. According to Capeci," Prominent Jewish Detroit's had supported the Urban League, genuinely but paternalistically concerned more with improving the welfare of black than raising their status." Following the Detroit race riot of 1943, Detroit Mayor Edward Jeffries decided to appoint a Jewish woman to his newly-established Inter-Racial Committee, and named Mrs. Golda Krolik, who served on this committee until 1968.

1940s 
In the 1940s, Jews in Detroit were involved in their neighborhood's policies. They were concerned with who was living where, who was moving, and why. In the fall of 1947, the Jewish Community Council joined forces with the Interracial Committee of the NAACP to create the Midtown Neighborhood Council.

Late 1960s and 1970s 
In the late 1960s and 1970s, there were progressive democratic ideologies in Detroit. There were radical political ideas from the left, the right, and the black separatist groups.

In 1963 Rabbi Sherwin Wine, located in Metro Detroit, founded the Humanistic Judaism movement. In 1966, Rabbi Morris Adler of Congregation Shaarey Zedek was shot while leading a service on the bima, and later succumbed to his wounds.

The Rise of the Suburbs (1950–1958) 
In the 1950s Jewish settlement patterns changed from the northwest suburb of Detroit into Jewish spaces. In 1958, one-fifth of all Detroit Jews lived in Oak Park and Huntington Woods. But, some left for the suburbs with a sense of defeat. According to Berman, "Most, however, expressed optimism that the suburbs would become a newer, better location for American and Jewish life than the city had been. Suburban planning commissions, driven by the building industry and federal incentives for home building in the suburbs, helped create the landscape of optimism."

The Later Suburban Neighborhoods (1970–1988) 

Stiefel wrote that by the 1970s the exodus of Jews from the City of Detroit to the suburbs had increased from a "trickle" to a "deluge." There were 80,000 Jews living in  Metro Detroit in 1976, of a total population of 4,138,800, and in the metro area there were 34 congregations: 23 Orthodox, 6 Conservative, 4 Reform, and one Humanistic. In the 1980s the Metro Detroit Jewish community lived in several municipalities. Barry Steifel, author of The Jewish Community of Metro Detroit 1945–2005, wrote that in the 1980s "the new, collective foci of the Jewish community" were several municipalities in Oakland County and western Wayne County which housed "massive congregations". Stiefel wrote that it was by then "nonexistent" in the City of Detroit. Suburban municipalities defined by Stiefel as foci included Bloomfield Hills, Farmington Hills, Oak Park, Royal Oak, Southfield, and West Bloomfield. Smaller congregations of Jewish people existed in other municipalities such as Livonia and Trenton.

In the 1980s many Russian Jews arrived in Metro Detroit because of the Soviet Union's 1988 relaxation of travel restrictions and the processes of its dissolution. Oak Park received most of these Russian Jews. The Metro Detroit Jewish community helped thousands of these Soviet Jews travel to Michigan.

Institutions
The Jewish Federation of Metropolitan Detroit is headquartered in Bloomfield Township, near Bloomfield Hills. The headquarters, the Max M. Fisher Building, was dedicated on May 3, 1992.

-Jewish Community Centers (J.C.C.) West Bloomfield, Ann Arbor, Oak Park (Closed)

-Jewish Day Schools. Hillel of Farmington Hills, Farber Hebrew (Yeshivat Akiva) of Southfield, Hebrew Day School of Ann Arbor, Frankel Jewish Academy (High School) West Bloomfield

-Jewish Summer Camps. Tamarack Camps formerly Fresh Air Society (Not to be confused with Fresh Air ), Willoway Day Camp, Camp Tanuga (Jewish owned), Camp Sea-Gull (Now Closed)

-Jewish Delicatessens. Stage, Bread Basket, Star, Pickles & Rye, New York Bagel & Deli, Al's Famous Deli, Uncle Harry's. 

-Bagel Shops. New York Bagel, Detroit Bagel Factory, Original Bagel Factory, Elaine's Bagels.

-Kosher Food Distributors. Topor's Pickles Co., Sy Ginsberg Meat & Deli, SeaFare Foods, Superior Baking (New Modern Baking)

-Jewish Bakery. Zeman's Kosher, Star, Diamond, Modern, Mertz, Vienna, Jewel, Bakestation.

-Funeral Chapels. Dorfman, Ira Kaufman, Hebrew Memorial.

-Cemeteries. Adas Shalom Memorial Park, Machpelah, Beth Olem, B'nai David, Elmwood, Hebrew Memorial Park, Clover Hill, Beth El, Beth Abraham, Beth Tefilo

Education

Primary and secondary schools
The Jean and Samuel Frankel Jewish Academy of Metropolitan Detroit is located in West Bloomfield.

Hillel Day School is in Farmington Hills.

The Tushiyah United Hebrew School previously operated in Detroit.

Yeshiva Beth Yehudah

Farber Hebrew Day School-Yeshivat Akiva

Yeshivas Darchei Torah

Colleges and universities
Michigan Jewish Institute (closed since 2016) had its U.S. administrative office in Southfield and its primary campus in West Bloomfield Township.

Religion

In the early 20th Century Jews of many nationalities had settled Detroit. The German Jews, who predominately lived north of Downtown Detroit, usually worshiped at Reform Temple Beth El. Russian and Eastern European Jews tended to worship at lower east side Jewish district Orthodox synagogues.

In Delray the First Hebrew Congregation of Delray or the Orthodox Hungarian Jewish Congregation was located on Burdeno, near Fort Wayne. It was operated by Hungarian Jews and it was Detroit's first Orthodox Judaism synagogue that was west of Woodward Avenue.

Media
The Detroit Jewish News serves the Jewish community in Metro Detroit.

In 1951 there were Jewish community newspapers in Detroit in the English and Yiddish languages. Two English-language newspapers, The Jewish News and the Jewish Chronicle, were weekly. There were Detroit editions of The Jewish Daily Forward and one other paper, two daily Yiddish papers.

Notable people
 A. Alfred Taubman
 Steve Ballmer
 Dan Gilbert
 Eric Lefkofsky
 Debbie Schlussel
 Sherwin Wine
 Doug Fieger
 Geoffrey Fieger
 Avraham Jacobovitz
 Gary Torgow
 Carl Levin
 Gilda Radner
 Sander Levin
 Gary Yourofsky
 Richard H. Bernstein
 Aaron Krickstein
 Elizabeth Berkley
 Dana Jacobson
 Selma Blair
 William Davidson
 Max Fisher
 David Hermelin
 Jerry Bruckheimer
 Don Was

See also

 Demographics of Metro Detroit
 Isaac Agree Downtown Synagogue
 Bonstelle Theatre (former Temple Beth-El)
 History of the Middle Eastern people in Metro Detroit
 History of the Indian Americans in Metro Detroit
 Interfaith Leadership Council of Metropolitan Detroit

Notes

References
 Babson, Steve. Working Detroit: The Making of a Union Town. Wayne State University Press, 1986. , 9780814318195.
 Cohen, Irwin J. Jewish Detroit. Arcadia Publishing, 2002. , 9780738519968.
Focuses on the Jewish community from the beginning until 1945
 Steifel, Barry. The Jewish Community of Metro Detroit 1945–2005. Arcadia Publishing, 2006. , 9780738540535.
 Woodford, Arthur M. This is Detroit, 1701–2001. Wayne State University Press, 2001. , 9780814329146.

Further reading
 Bolkosky, Sidney M. Harmony & Dissonance: Voices of Jewish Identity in Detroit, 1914–1967. Wayne State University Press, 1991. , 9780814319338.
 Applebaum, Elizabeth. "‘What A Place This Was’ A longtime Jewish resident of the Motor City ponders a town down but perhaps not out." (Archive). The Jewish Week. October 9, 2013.

External links
 Jewish Federation of Metro Detroit

Jews
Jews
Detroit
Jewish
 
Detroit
Detroit